Mathias Robert Lange (born April 13, 1985) is an Austrian former professional ice hockey goaltender. He last played for the Iserlohn Roosters of the Deutsche Eishockey Liga (DEL).

Playing career
Lange joined the Roosters after previously playing with SC Bietigheim-Bissingen of the 2nd Bundesliga. On July 27, 2013, Lange signed a one-year contract to be the backup goaltender with the Iserlohn Roosters of the DEL.

Lange played with the Roosters for 6 seasons before leaving as a free agent following the 2018–19 season on March 9, 2019.

Lange ended his professional playing career following his tenure with the Roosters, returning to North America in accepting a position with his former collegiate team R.P.I. as an operations co-ordinator.  On August 10, 2021, RPI announced the appointment of Mathias Lange as the Men's Assistant Hockey Coach.

International play

Lange competed in the 2013 IIHF World Championship as a member of the Austria men's national ice hockey team.  He made his Olympic debut on February 14, 2014 in the 2014 Winter Olympics in Sochi, Russia, playing for the Austrian team.

Awards and honors

References

External links

1985 births
Living people
Austrian ice hockey goaltenders
DEG Metro Stars players
Ice hockey players at the 2014 Winter Olympics
Iserlohn Roosters players
EC KAC players
Olympic ice hockey players of Austria
Sportspeople from Klagenfurt
RPI Engineers men's ice hockey players
SC Bietigheim-Bissingen players
Schwenninger Wild Wings players